Sinajana is the smallest of the nineteen villages in the United States territory of Guam by area.  It is located in the hills south of Hagåtña (formerly Agana).  The village's name may have come from the word "china-jan," cookware used to cook wild yams that once grew in the area.

Urban renewal
Sinajana is one of a few villages that was urbanized as a result of a federal urban renewal program. Afami, Agana Springs, and Didigue are a few non-urbanized areas within this same village. There are over 75 homes in Afami, most of which are built below a high cliff, with a few homes high atop a ridge overlooking Hagatna and Mong-Mong. Agana Springs is located below the cliff line of Sinajana and contains a natural spring with small living creatures like frogs and turtles. Didigue is located at the other end of Agana Springs and is accessible by taking a steep single lane road through Afame. Although called Didigue, it is named Spring Lane.

Census

As of the 2000 census, the village of Sinajana was reported as having a total population of 2,853. Of that number, 1,433 (50.2%) are male, and 1,420 (49.8%) are female. Of the total population in Sinajana, a little less than 10% were under 5 years old, and 2% were 75 years or older. The median age was found to be 28.7 years. Of the total, 65% were Guamanians, 11% Asian (including Chinese, Filipino, Japanese, Korean, other Asian), 4% Chuukese, and at little less than 4% White. Of the total that are enrolled in school, half were enrolled in elementary school, a little less than a quarter were enrolled in highschool, and a little more than 15% were enrolled in college or graduate school.

Of the total population of 2,853, 1,604 attained an education. The difference of these numbers may be as a result of children that are not of school age qualification. Of the 1,604 people that have attained an education, 35% are high school graduates, 19% earned some level of college with no degree, 15.6% have attained a high school education, 12.5% have earned an undergraduate degree, and 6.5% have earned a graduate or professional degree. Of these numbers, 77.2% attained a high school diploma or higher, and 19% have earned a bachelor's degree or higher.

Of the total population in Sinajana, 193 grandparents reported being responsible for at least one grandchild. With respect to veteran status, 13.5% of the adult civilian population 18 years and older were veterans.

The U.S. Census Bureau counts it under multiple census-designated places: Sinajana, and Afame.

Education

Guam Public School System serves the island.

George Washington High School in Mangilao serves the village.

Bishop Baumgartner Memorial Catholic School, a private Catholic school, is in Sinajana.

Notable residents
Valentino Perez - Local entrepreneur
Peter R. Onedera - Writer, Author and Playwright
Flora Baza Quan - Singer, Author, Musician
Dr. Bernadita Camacho-Dungca -   Educator, Researcher, Author
Rev. Fr. Eric E. Forbes OFM Cap. -  Catholic Priest, Author, Historian,
Lt. Governor Joshua Tenorio

Mayor of Sinajana

Commissioner
 Manuel G. Sablan (1953–1957)
 Luis C. Baza (1957–1965)
 Francisco R. Santos (1965–1968)
 Alfonso M. Pangelinan (1968–1973)

Mayor
 Ignacio N. Sablan (1973–1981)
 Francisco N. Lizama (1981–1997)
 Daniel E. Sablan (1997–2005)
 Roke B. Blas (2005–2013)
 Robert R.C. Hofmann (2013–present)

Deputy Commissioner
 Luis C. Baza (1944–1957)
 Vicente S. Iriarte (1957–1961)
 Jacinto B. Calvo (1961–1965)
 Alfonso M. Pangelinan (1965–1967)
 Ignacio N. Sablan (1969–1973)

Vice Mayor
 Francisco N. Lizama (1973–1981)
 Daniel E. Sablan (1981–1997)
 Roke B. Blas (1997–2001)
 Vicente S.A. Lizama (2001–2005)
 Robert R.C. Hofmann (2005–2013)
 Rudy Don Iriarte (2013–present)

See also
 Villages of Guam

References

Villages in Guam
Census-designated places in Guam